Al Amer Hawran is a sub-district located in Radman Al Awad District, Al Bayda Governorate, Yemen.  Al Amer Hawran had a population of 2233 according to the 2004 census.

References 

Sub-districts in Radman Al Awad District